Masters W40 shot put world record progression is the progression of world record improvements of the shot put W40 division of Masters athletics.  Records must be set in properly conducted, official competitions under the standing IAAF rules unless modified by World Masters Athletics.  

The W40 division consists of female athletes who have reached the age of 40 but have not yet reached the age of 45, so exactly from their 40th birthday to the day before their 45th birthday. The W40 division throws a 4 kg implement, the same weight as the Open division.

Key

References

Masters Athletics Shot Put list
All Time Athletics

Masters athletics world record progressions
Shot